Donkervoort Automobielen BV is a manufacturer of hand-built and ultra light weight sports cars based in Lelystad, Netherlands. The car brand was founded in 1978 by Joop Donkervoort.
In 1996, Donkervoort's Ford engines were replaced by Audi engines. Donkervoort's motto – "No Compromise" – means driving without any electronic aids such as ABS (Anti-lock braking system), Electronic stability program (ESP) or power steering.

Corporate history
Donkervoort is a privately-held company controlled by founder Joop Donkervoort until he retired in 2019 and his son Denis succeeded him as Managing Director in 2021. Marianne Donkervoort, who is married to Joop, and Amber, their daughter, also have played key roles in developing the business and branding of the company. Amber was an equestrian who joined the company as the marketing manager following an internship in China. The Donkervoort S8A was named for Amber, while the D8 was named for Denis.

Joop started the company as a kit car importer in 1978, but upon learning he needed to make significant modifications to make the assembled kit cars street legal, began building the first S7 automobiles using a design derived from the Lotus Seven in a Tienhoven shed. In 1983, Donkervoort moved to a larger production facility in Loosdrecht, followed by another move in 2000 to its present headquarters and factory in Lelystad. Chassis production, which previously had been contracted to an external supplier, was brought in-house to Lelystad in 2003.

Future plans

Donkervoort announced on their website that is expanding its worldwide locations and services, most recently being available as a car brand in the US.

Automobiles

Current models
Donkervoort F22 (2022)

Donkervoort announced in October 2022 on their website that has ended the production of D8 series and is planning to produce a new model, Donkervoort F22. It will be less than 800 kg and will have similar features to the previous models. Further details were provided in a November press release announcing the F22 will be launched on December 10, 2022. Donkervoort stated the F22 would be faster, larger, more rigid, and more efficient than the D8 GTO.

As announced in December 2022, the F22 was a limited-production model with just 75 examples produced; of these, 50 were sold already. The drivetrain uses a five-cylinder engine from Audi that develops  /  and drives the rear wheels through a five-speed manual transmission. Donkervoort tout it as having improved "practicality, comfort, and ease of use", featuring the car's  trunk. It is named for Filippa, the daughter of managing director Denis Donkervoort, born in 2022.

Previous models

Donkervoort S7/S8

Donkervoort S7
The first Donkervoort – the S7 – was introduced in 1978. It is an ultra-light weight sports car manufactured in Tienhoven between 1978 and 1982. It was replaced by the Donkervoort S8 in late 1983. Mechanically, the car used a Triumph front axle and an Escort rear axle.

Donkervoort S8/S8A
Introduced in late 1983, the S8 and later S8A were the first Donkervoorts of notice, with the "Eight" implying an improvement over the Lotus Seven. Of exactly the same dimensions as the Donkervoort Super Seven, these cars originally used a two-liter inline-four engine from Ford of Europe. In 1985, the S8 was upgraded with a five-speed gearbox, a Donkervoort front axle, and a rear axle from the Ford Capri. The S8A also was introduced that year with a wider front track and an independent rear suspension, distinguished by refreshed styling and new adhesive-based manufacturing. Production of the S8 ended in 1989, and the S8A was discontinued in 1993.

Donkervoort S8AT 
Responding to the need for more power, a turbocharged version of the S8A was introduced in 1986; this car is identifiable by a profusion of various vents and openings to cool the engine. The S8AT was improved in 1988, receiving the chassis and larger engine from the D10 until it was discontinued in 1994.

Donkervoort D8

Donkervoort D8 Zetec (1993-1999)
From 1993 the new D8 was built, marking the continuing departure from being merely a Super Seven copy. The first D8s were the last Donkervoorts to receive Ford engines; 1.8 and 2.0-liter versions from the Zetec family. Donkervoort offered a "Sport" version that changed to cycle-style front fenders and reduced weight through the use of carbon fibre body parts.

Donkervoort D8 Cosworth (1995-1999)
The D8 also was fitted with the 2.0-liter turbocharged Cosworth YB engine starting in 1995.

Donkervoort D8 Audi (1999–2008)

Donkervoort D8 Audi (E-gas) Wide Track (2003–2012)
Since 2003, the Donkervoort is equipped with the Audi 1.8T 20V E-gas (electronic throttle) turbocharged engine. In the D8, the engine is available with 150 bhp, 180 bhp, 210 bhp and 270 bhp. The Wide Track models can be distinguished from earlier Audi-powered models by the front light arrangement.

Donkervoort D8 270 (2008–2012)
The Donkervoort D8 270 is available since the summer of 2008. This version of the D8 series became the successor of the D8 270 RS, the limited edition that was introduced in 2005 and restricted to 25 numbered units. The D8 270 has a restyled nose and grill that refer directly to the D8 GT and accelerates from 0–100 km/h in 3.6 seconds.

This car was the seventh fastest production car on Nürburgring's famous Nordschleife of 2011, at 7m 14.9s.

Donkervoort D8 GT (2007–2012)
The Donkervoort D8 GT - introduced in 2007 - is the first closed Donkervoort. Compared to the open version of the D8, the D8 GT has entirely new front and rear suspension, increased track width by 8 centimeters, larger brakes for increased stopping power and 17-inch aluminum wheels. This is largely due to the extensive use of carbon fiber: the entire roof, the entire rear and the doors and fenders of the car are made of this material.

Donkervoort D8 GTO
Donkervoort D8 GTO (2013–present)
The Donkervoort D8 GTO is a completely new creation. The engine, a 2.5L TFSI 5-cylinder turbocharged Audi engine, has a power output of 250-280 kW (340-380PS/335-375 bhp) and 450Nm of torque at 1600rpm, and the whole car weighs less than 700 kg. This low weight is due to composite materials such as the full carbon fibre body of the D8 GTO. With a power-to-weight ratio of just 1.8 kg/PS the car accelerates from 0–100 km/h in 2.8s and from 0–200 km/h in just 8.6s.

The very first GTOs were produced in a limited series of 25 Premium D8 GTOs in 2013. The production of the regular D8 GTO, available in a Touring or a Performance version, started in 2014.

Donkervoort D8 GTO RS (2016–present)
Donkervoort introduced the D8 GTO RS in October 2016 as the successor to their D8 270 RS. Donkervoort states that they have reduced the D8 GTO's drag coefficient by 20 percent. The GTO RS offers a new suspension system as an additional option, and also offers a dual-clutch automatic transmission setup. It is not street legal.

Donkervoort D8 GTO Individual series (2021)
In July 2021 Donkervoort announced on their website that they were launching a newer vehicle and their moto was "Any company can sell their cars. Only Donkervoort can create your car - The choice is yours". The model D8 GTO Individual series was launched on 9 September 2021 and was the first Donkervoort model available in purple color.

Limited editions and prototypes
Donkervoort D10 (1988)
This sleek, minimalist version was built in a very limited series of ten to celebrate Donkervoort's tenth anniversary in 1988. The cars lacked a spare wheel as well as a windshield, but benefitted from an enlarged (2,160 cc) version of the Ford engine with a bigger Garrett T3 turbocharger, producing .

Donkervoort D20 (1998)
Intended as the 20th anniversary special, the D20 was developed in conjunction with Audi under the sponsorship of CEO Dr. Franz-Josef Paefgen. Until the D20, all Donkervoorts had the engine and gearbox in the front, but the D20 had the engine in the front and the gearbox in the rear as a transaxle. The D20 was the first Donkervoort with a V6 engine, which was actually intended for larger, more comfortable Audi cars. The engine was modified to produced . The D20 was built as a prototype, but never went into production as it was unable to meet emissions standards with the larger engine.

Donkervoort J25 (2003)
Intended as the 25th anniversary special, the J25 used the nose and doors from the D20 with modernized styling and was the first Donkervoort to develop . A prototype was built but it never entered regular production.

Donkervoort D8 270 RS (2005)

The D8 270 RS was built in a limited edition of 25 examples to celebrate the prototype RS that was used to set the production car lap record at the Nurburgring Nordschleife.

Donkervoort D8 GTO Premium (2013)
The Premium D8 GTO's were the first GTO's to be produced. After a sneak preview event introducing the D8 GTO in December 2012, existing customer were able to obtain one of these full option GTO's. The Premium D8 GTO were built as a limited series of 25 cars and had a little more power (380+ BHP) than e.g. the D8 GTO Performance.
Donkervoort D8 GTO Bilster Berg Edition (2014–2015)
In September 2014, the Donkervoort D8 GTO broke the lap record at the German Bilster Berg Drive Resort. The 380 hp Performance version set the new record for street-legal production cars at 1 minute 46.12 seconds. To celebrate this milestone – along with the opening of a Donkervoort subsidiary at that same location that year, Donkervoort introduced the Bilster Berg Edition, which was based on the record-breaking test car and built in a limited series of just 14 cars, a number that represented the successful year 2014. Technical developments included the further development and fine-tuning in the areas of chassis and road-handling. Furthermore, this edition is easily recognisable by its dark nose section, made entirely of carbon fibre.
Donkervoort D8 GTO-40 (2018)

For the firm's 40th anniversary, the GTO-40 was released as a limited edition of 40. Weight has been reduced by  compared to the conventional GTO through the use of carbon fibre sandwich panels (branded and patented by Donkervoort as EX-CORE) and an optimized steel tubular chassis.

Donkervoort D8 GTO JD-70 (2019)
For the founder's 70th birthday, Joop Donkervoort a special edition called Donkervoort D8 GTO JD-70 was produced, again making use of Donkervoort's EX-CORE technology. In total, there were 70 produced, including the Bare Naked Carbon Edition and JD70 R sub-variants. The Bare Naked Carbon Edition highlighted the extensive use of carbon fibre body panels by changing the painted finish to a clear coat, and was offered in four levels corresponding to the degree of paint reduction, ranging from "Exposed Carbon" (matte or gloss clear coats over the side panels, engine-bay wings, bonnet scoop, triangular cover scoops, and interior) to "Full-Exposed Coloured Carbon" (tinted clear coat finish over all carbon fibre parts). The JD70 R is a track-tuned edition with racing-specific improvements, and Donkervoort includes driver coaching and data analysis services with the purchase of the car.

References

External links

Introduction, history and overview of Donkervoort by Carfection (video)
Donkervoort D8 GTO First Heartbeat
Donkervoort D8 GTO-RS test-drive by Carfection (video)
Donkervoort - 24H Dubai
Donkervoort Discovery Channel
Donkervoort fan site with much independent information, pictures etc.

 
Cars of the Netherlands
Car manufacturers of the Netherlands
Roadsters
Sports car manufacturers
Dutch brands
Lelystad
Retro-style automobiles
Dutch companies established in 1978
Vehicle manufacturing companies established in 1978